Serpent Moon is a 1995 role-playing game adventure for Nephilim published by Chaosium.

Contents
Serpent Moon is a collection of four loosely linked scenarios for Nephilim.

Reception
Andrew Rilstone reviewed Serpent Moon for Arcane magazine, rating it a 6 out of 10 overall. Rilstone comments that "a Nephilim campaign turns out to be a little like supercharged Call of Cthulhu session - investigations, clues, secret cults and earth-shattering rituals. This makes the book hard work to read and demanding to run but, in the hands of a good referee with a feel for the Nephilim universe, potentially very rewarding to play."

References

Role-playing game adventures
Role-playing game supplements introduced in 1995